Cochlespira beuteli is a species of sea snail, a marine gastropod mollusk in the family Cochlespiridae.

Description
The shell grows to a length of 23 mm.

Distribution
This species is distributed from the Gulf of Carpentaria to Queensland, Australia

References

 Powell, A.W.B., 1969. - The family Turridae in the Indo-Pacifie. Part 2. The subfamily Turrieulinae. Indo-Pacific Mollusca, 2 (10): 207-415
 Wilson, B. 1994. Australian Marine Shells. Prosobranch Gastropods. Kallaroo, WA : Odyssey Publishing Vol. 2 370 pp.
 Tucker, J.K. 2004. Catalog of recent and fossil turrids (Mollusca: Gastropoda). Zootaxa 682: 1–1295

External links

beuteli
Gastropods described in 1969